Ramlan Yatim (born 10 September 1922) was an Indonesian footballer. He competed in the men's tournament at the 1956 Summer Olympics.

References

External links
 
 

1922 births
Possibly living people
Indonesian footballers
Indonesia international footballers
Olympic footballers of Indonesia
Footballers at the 1956 Summer Olympics
Place of birth missing
Association football midfielders
PSMS Medan players